Martin Wild (born 2 December 1952) is a German ice hockey player. He competed in the men's tournaments at the 1972 Winter Olympics and the 1980 Winter Olympics.

References

External links
 

1952 births
Living people
German ice hockey players
Olympic ice hockey players of West Germany
Ice hockey players at the 1972 Winter Olympics
Ice hockey players at the 1980 Winter Olympics
Sportspeople from Garmisch-Partenkirchen